Dennis L. McKinley (born November 3, 1976) is a former American football fullback in the National Football League who played for the Arizona Cardinals. He played college football for the Mississippi State Bulldogs.

He was arrested for drug trafficking in 2003.

References

1976 births
Living people
American football fullbacks
Arizona Cardinals players
Mississippi State Bulldogs football players